Andrew John Bernard Rowe (11 September 1935 – 21 November 2008) was a politician in the United Kingdom. He was born in London.  He served as Conservative Party Member of Parliament for Mid Kent from 1983 to 1997 and its successor constituency Faversham and Mid Kent from 1997 until he stepped down in 2001. He was replaced by Hugh Robertson.

He was educated at Eton College and Merton College, Oxford (MA).

He was the father of actor Nicholas Rowe. He was also the founding Father of the UK Youth Parliament.

References

External links 

1935 births
2008 deaths
People educated at Eton College
Alumni of Merton College, Oxford
Conservative Party (UK) MPs for English constituencies
UK MPs 1983–1987
UK MPs 1987–1992
UK MPs 1992–1997
UK MPs 1997–2001
Politicians from London